Sheila on 7 is a pop rock band from Yogyakarta, Indonesia. They have changed their lineup several times since their formation on 6 May 1996. Their first lineup consisted of Akhdiyat Duta Modjo (also known as Duta, vocals), Saktia "Sakti" Ari Seno (guitar), Eross Candra (guitar), Adam Muhammad Subarkah (bass) and Anton Widiastanto (drums). Anton left in 2004 while Sakti left in 2006, leaving their current lineup as it is but with Brian Kresna Putro replacing Anton in the drums until his departure in 2022.

Their self titled debut album Sheila on 7 was ranked #33 by Rolling Stone Indonesia on "The 150 Greatest Indonesian Albums of All Time". The magazine also listed the songs "Dan" (#29) and "Melompat Lebih Tinggi" (#147) on "The 150 Greatest Indonesian Songs of All Time".

Sheila on 7 is the first ever band in Indonesia with their first 3 albums sold more than 1 million copies in Indonesia only, with Kisah Klasik Untuk Masa Depan ranked #8 and Sheila on 7 ranked #13 on the list of Indonesian all time best selling albums. Kisah Klasik Untuk Masa Depan charted at #1 on Hits Albums of the World on Billboard Malaysia. By now, Sheila on 7 has sold estimated more than 8 million copies album in Indonesia.

History 

The band came from an earlier incarnation called " W.H.Y Gank " which was headed by Adam and Sakti. Both members had invited Duta - who had been performing with Adam at as a singer and acoustic guitar duo at their neighbourhood 17 August celebrations - to join their band practice to be a vocalist. A year after "W.H.Y Gank" was formed, the band met Eross (who then became their lead guitarist). The four of them decided to form a new band, and while at their first studio jamming session Eross introduced the band to Anton. The band was given the name "Sheilagank" - "Sheila" being the name of a female friend both Adam and Eross knew of - with the official formation date being 6 May 1996. Sheilagank performed in numerous band festivals organised by high schools for about 2 years until the middle of 1998, when they got their first recording contract with the Sony Music Entertainment Indonesia label. The members changed their band name to "Sheila On 7": the "on 7" referring to the seven-note solfège, while "Sheilagank" became the name of their fanbase.

Sheila On 7 since its beginning in the Indonesian music scene has made a lot of achievements, including being the only Indonesian band that is able to sell physical albums for more than one million copies, three albums in a row. Through the success of the debut album Sheila On 7 (1999), followed by two other albums that exploded in the market, Kisah Klasik Untuk Masa Depan (2000) and 07 Des (2002). In 2003, they released their first film soundtrack Ost. 30 Hari Mencari Cinta which succeeded sold over 600.000 copies and followed by their fourth studio album Pejantan Tangguh in 2004, although not as successful as the first three albums where sales reached millions, this album was able to sell more than 450,000 copies. Because of that success, they  also have loyal listeners in neighboring countries such as Malaysia, Singapore and Brunei.

On 18 October 2004, Anton was dismissed from the band management due to disciplinary issues while Brian filled Anton's position. Brian performed with Sheila On 7 in different promo tours for the album Pejantan Tangguh. The Very Best of Sheila On 7: Jalan Terus (2005) album became the first studio recording release after the drummer replacement.

In 2006, Sakti left the band amidst recording 507 as he was to continue his studies in Pakistan and this did not gel with their schedule. it was during this time that Brian was promoted as their permanent drummer until 2022.

On 26 January 2018, Sheila on 7 released their first single entitled "Film Favorit" under their own label named 507 Records. It also be their first time to involves music directors for working on their song. "Film Favorit"  itself is a song created by guitarist Eross, which inspired the story of a close friend who has not managed to find a life partner.

Musical style 
Their musical style is deemed difficult to determine though it is still in the pop rock genre, but it is clear that they are believed to play a "Sheila music", where ideas or creations for their songs emerge spontaneously, hence the simple lyrics and musical concepts. Sheila on 7 tend to compose upbeat and optimistic songs that reflect the bliss of being teenagers and young adults.

Band members 

Current members
 Akhdiyat Duta Modjo — lead vocal (1996–present)
 Eross Candra — lead guitar & backing vocal (1996–present)
 Adam Muhammad Subarkah — bass guitar & backing vocal (1996–present)

Former members
 Anton Widiastanto — drummer (1996–2004)
 Saktia Ari Seno — rhythm guitar & backing vocal (1996–2006)
 Brian Kresna Putro - drummer (2004-2022)

Timeline 

Timeline

Discography

Studio albums

Compilation albums

Filmography 

 30 Hari Mencari Cinta (2004)
 Tak Biasa (2004)
 Mati Bujang Tengah Malam (2007)
 Tanda Tanya (2012)
 Scripts Pro (2014)

Awards and nominations

Notes 
 The album was renamed as Pria Terhebat in the Malaysian and Singaporean releases.

References

External links 
 Official site
 
 Sheila on 7 discography on iTunes
 Sheila on 7 discography on Discogs
 Guitar Chord Sheila On 7

Anugerah Musik Indonesia winners
Indonesian alternative rock groups
Indonesian pop music groups
Musical groups established in 1996